Jean-Yves Terlain (born November 12, 1944 in Angers), is a French navigator and architect. He is the uncle of the famous sailing brothers Bruno and Loïck Peyron.

He studied naval architecture at the Sorbonne and was the youngest sailor to finish the 1968 OSTAR, sailing singlehanded from Plymouth, England to Newport, Rhode Island.  He competed in the first Vendée Globe in 1989-1990 where he had to retire onboard UAP having lost the mast in the Indian Ocean. The boat was marked by it unique ahead of it time enclosed cockpit.

References

1944 births
Living people
People from Angers
French male sailors (sport)
Sportspeople from Angers
IMOCA 60 class sailors
French Vendee Globe sailors
1989 Vendee Globe sailors